Vladimir Vladimirovich Antonik (born 13 February 1953) is a Russian actor and voice actor. He is best known for his performance as Trofimov in Lenin in Paris.

Selected filmography

Film

References

External links 

1953 births
Living people
People from Slonim
Soviet male film actors
Soviet male voice actors
Russian male film actors
Russian male voice actors